Cime de Caron is a mountain of Savoie, France. It lies in the Massif de la Vanoise range. It is a mountain in the Three Valleys (Les Trois Vallées) a popular ski resort, in the valley of Les Belleville, in the resort of Val Thorens. It has four ski slopes: three black, and one red. One of the blacks (Combe de Rosael) goes into the secret fourth valley, in the three valleys, Orelle. Cime de Caron is the second-highest skiing point in the Three Valleys.

References

Mountains of the Alps
Alpine three-thousanders
Mountains of Savoie